Gabon Telecom SA is the largest telecom company in Gabon. The company manages the country's country code top-level domain, .ga. It operates about 35,000 land lines, and its cellular phone service subsidiary, Libertis, has 200,000 customers. In 2007, Maroc Telecom acquired 51% of the company from the government of Gabon. In June 2018, Gabon Telecom launched APS solutions to protect 400,000 IP addresses.

References

Telecommunications companies of Gabon
Companies based in Libreville

Maroc Telecom